NGC 3302 is an unbarred lenticular galaxy in the constellation Antlia. It was discovered by the astronomer John Herschel on January 28, 1835.

References 

Antlia
3302
Unbarred lenticular galaxies
031391